The 1997 cricket season was the 98th in which the County Championship has been an official competition. The season centred on the six-Test Ashes series against Australia. England won the first, at Edgbaston, by the decisive margin of nine wickets, and the rain-affected second Test at Lord's was drawn, but any English optimism was short-lived. Australia won the next three games by huge margins to secure the series and retain The Ashes, and England's three-day victory in the final game at The Oval was little more than a consolation prize. It was the 68th test series between the two sides with Australia finally winning 3-2 The three-match ODI series which preceded the Tests produced a statistical curiosity, with England winning each match by an identical margin, six wickets.

The Britannic Assurance County Championship went to Glamorgan for the first time since 1969, by a margin of just four points from Kent. The combination of captain Matthew Maynard and Steve James' batting and Waqar Younis' and Steve Watkin's bowling propelled them to the title, although the matter was not settled until the final match of the season, when Glamorgan's maximum-points thrashing of Somerset at Taunton ensured that Kent's own victory over Surrey was irrelevant.

In one-day cricket, Warwickshire won the AXA Life League by two points from Kent, but were themselves thrashed by nine wickets by Essex in the final of the NatWest Trophy. The honours in the Benson & Hedges Cup went to Surrey, who beat Kent by eight wickets in the final.

Ali Brown's 203 for Surrey in the AXA Life League against Hampshire in July remains the only double century ever scored in a 40-over List A match.

Honours
County Championship - Glamorgan
NatWest Trophy - Essex
Sunday League - Warwickshire
Benson & Hedges Cup - Surrey
Minor Counties Championship - Devon
MCCA Knockout Trophy - Norfolk
Second XI Championship - Lancashire II 
Wisden - Matthew Elliott, Stuart Law, Glenn McGrath, Matthew Maynard, Graham Thorpe

Statistical highlights

First-class
 Highest team total: 631/7 dec by Warwickshire v Hampshire at Southampton, 29–30 May
 Lowest team total: 31 by Glamorgan v Middlesex at Cardiff, 14 June
 Highest individual innings: 303* by Graeme Hick (Worcestershire) v Hampshire at Southampton, 18–19 September
 Most runs in season: 1,775 by Steve James (Glamorgan)
 Best innings bowling: 9-64 by Melvyn Betts (Durham) v Northamptonshire at Northampton, 28 August
 Most wickets in season: 83 by Mike Smith (Gloucestershire and England)

List A
 Highest team total: 371/6 (50 overs) by Leicestershire v Scotland at Leicester, 28 April
 Lowest team total: 53 by Ireland v Yorkshire at Leeds, 24 June
 Highest individual innings: 203 by Ali Brown (Surrey) v Hampshire at Guildford, 20 July
 Most runs in season: 1,088 by Stuart Law (Essex)
 Best innings bowling: 7-24 by Mushtaq Ahmed (Somerset) v Ireland at Taunton, 2 May
 Most wickets in season: 53 by Allan Donald (Warwickshire)

Ashes tour

County Championship

Sunday League

NatWest Trophy

Benson & Hedges Cup

Averages

First-class

Batting
Qualification: eight innings

Bowling
Qualification: ten wickets

List A

Batting
Qualification: eight innings

Bowling
Qualification: ten wickets

References

External sources
 CricketArchive – season and tournament itineraries
 England Domestic Season 1997 at Cricinfo

Annual reviews
 Playfair Cricket Annual 1998
 Wisden Cricketers' Almanack 1998

English cricket seasons in the 20th century
English Cricket Season, 1997
Cricket season
 
Welsh cricket in the 20th century